Kristen Kvello (19 October 1931– 8 September 1998) was a Norwegian cross-country skier and coach, sports official and magazine editor. He was the father of Berit Aunli.

Kvello competed for the clubs Malvik IL, Selbu IL and Mebondens IL. He was Norwegian champion in 50 km in 1957, and two times in the relay (1952 and 1953). In 1956 he became world champion in military patrol.

He was head coach for the Norwegian national cross-country team from 1958 to 1964. He was the first person to be appointed all-year-round in this position, and his team gatherings established a pattern also for later generations.

He published the book Ski, stjerner og ungdom in 1965, and was editor of the Norwegian Ski Federation's magazine Skiidrett.

Cross-country skiing results
All results are sourced from the International Ski Federation (FIS).

World Championships

References

1931 births
1998 deaths
Norwegian male cross-country skiers
Norwegian cross-country skiing coaches
Norwegian Olympic coaches
Norwegian magazine editors